The Mercedes-Benz Vito is a mid-sized light commercial vehicle (LCV) produced by Mercedes-Benz, available as a panel van, chassis cab, or multi-purpose vehicle (MPV), carrying cargo or up to eight passengers. In the Mercedes-Benz van lineup, it is positioned between the larger Sprinter and the smaller Citan.

The Vito refers to the cargo van variant for commercial use; when passenger accommodations are substituted for part or all of the load area, it is known as the V-Class or Viano. The V-Class/Viano is a large MPV.

The first generation went on sale in 1996. The second generation was introduced in 2004, and the vehicle received the new Viano name. In 2010, the vehicle was facelifted with revised front and rear bumpers and lights. The interior was also improved with upgraded materials and new technology. The third generation was launched in 2014 and returned to being called V-Class.

The Vito/Viano is available in both rear- and four-wheel-drive configurations and comes in three lengths, two wheelbases and a choice of four petrol and diesel engines (as well as two specialist tuned models) coupled to either a six-speed manual or five-speed TouchShift automatic transmission.


First generation (W 638; 1996)

The first generation Mercedes-Benz Vito was produced between 1996 and 2003. The range of gasoline engines consists of two old units from Mercedes (113 and 114) and a Volkswagen 2.8 VR6 engine, designated as the M104.900. When it comes to diesel engines, old 2.3 with and without turbo and also modern CDI 2.2 engines are available.

This body design was also sold as the V-Klasse in more luxurious and expensive version (V-Klasse was replaced with the Viano-name for the second generation of Vito). The Viano also included less van like features to the Vito such as only two seats in the front and a larger and more spacious seating capacity. At first many Vito drivers who wanted a spacious, small van opted for the Vito microbus which was extremely similar to the Viano, apart from its more van like and less luxurious features. The Viano was however a good, more car like option to the Vito microbus. It was designed by Michael Mauer from 1989 to 1991, when the final design was chosen and patented in February 1993, competing with the Citroën Jumpy, Peugeot Expert, Volkswagen Transporter, Fiat Scudo, Ford Transit, Hyundai H-1, Opel Vivaro, Renault Trafic, Toyota Hiace, and the ГАЗ Соболь.

Vito 108 E
Energy storage was provided by a molten-salt battery (ZEBRA sodium nickel-chloride chemistry) carried under the rear bench seat.

The 108 E was assembled at the "Competence Centre for Emission-free Mobility" (KEM) at the Mercedes-Benz Mannheim plant; due to the small scale of production and battery costs, it was estimated the 108 E would be three times the cost of a conventionally-powered Vito. Deutsche Post operated a small fleet of Vito 108 E delivery vans in Bremen.

Second generation (W639; 2003)

Six or seven seats come as standard in most markets. The Viano can be turned into an eight-seat people carrier by fitting two three-seater benches in the rear. All rear seats slide in  increments, recline and can be turned to face one other. They can also be folded down or removed completely to increase the load capacity. A rear folding table is standard in six- and seven-seat layouts. The rear seats cannot be folded into the floor like on some rivals.

It can tow a  braked trailer and a  unbraked trailer. An adjustable self-levelling rear suspension is included on higher specification models.

Japan passenger models were sold as the V-Class, as the V 350. Early models included V 350 Trend (RHD), V 350 Ambiente (RHD), V 350 Ambiente long (RHD).

In 2012, Mercedes-Benz released the Valente model in Australia to sit beneath the Viano as the entry-level passenger van.

Initial release

Vito

The Vito was launched in China in April 2010. Engine choices consisted of the 2.1 litre OM646 turbo diesel four-cylinder, the 2.5 litre M272 diesel V6 and the 3 litre diesel V6 which also uses the M272 name. A 6 speed manual gearbox is standard for four cylinder diesel variants while V6 diesel variants are equipped to a 5 speed automatic gearbox. Trims levels are available known as the 2.1T Diesel Elite. 2.1T Diesel Service, 2.5L Elite, 2.5L Service, 3.0L Service and 3.0L Business. Pricing ranges from 316,000 yuan to 389,000 yuan (46,000 to US$55,830 - March 2020 exchange rate). For actual car badging, the 2.1 litre Diesel models were known as the 115 CDI, the 119 for 2.5 litre V6 models and the 122 for 3 litre V6 models. The W639 Vito was then succeeded by the W447 in 2016 although most Vitos of the W639 variant are still in use for the Chinese market as of 2020 as ambulance vans in Beijing. 
 
The second generation Mercedes-Benz Vito design that is more streamlined than its predecessor, powered by a new range of engines, and a rear-wheel drive (RWD) drivetrain.

The angle of the windshield and A-pillar is closer to horizontal; the dashboard is bigger and the bonnet (hood) smaller. The new Vito is available in three different lengths and four diesel engine versions: the 109 CDI, 111 CDI, 115 CDI (all powered by a 4-cylinder 2.2-litre engine) and the 120 CDI (featuring the 3.0-litre V6 unit). The model numerics relate to their engine power output: currently the 109 has , the 111 has , the 115 has , and the 120 has . Blue-efficiency technology is optional. The vehicles have a new 6-speed manual gearbox gear ratios designed for fuel economy. The second generation Vitos are Euro 3 compliant (additionally Euro 4 compliant as of November 2006) and exempt from the Low Emission Zone in London, which requires commercial vehicles (vans) to reach at least Euro 3 standard from October 2010.

Vito London Taxi

In August 2008, a variant of the Vito was approved by the Public Carriage Office for use as a licensed London 'black cab'. The Vito taxicab includes electric sliding doors, electric steps and seating for six people. The Vito's rear-wheel steering enables it to meet the PCO's strict Conditions of Fitness requirements including a  turning circle and wheelchair accessibility. The vehicle, a variation of the 'Traveliner' model, is built by Penso in Coventry. The rear wheel steer system is licensed from one80, and it is distributed through Eco City Vehicles subsidiary KPM-UK Taxis.

The new Taxi does not perform the famous U-turn in the same way as the TX and Metro models, instead it incorporates an electrically operated rear wheel system, activated by a button adjacent to the steering wheel. This turns the rear wheels in the opposite direction to the front wheels, thus allowing the Taxi to perform the same tight turning circle as the TX and Metro models.

It is longer and wider than the TX models, but travelling through tight spaces is aided by the electric folding wing mirrors, which as of 2009 are standard.

Viano Marco Polo

In some countries a camping derivative is available - known as the Marco Polo - equipped with a galley (including gas stove, sink, 40 L fridge, and storage), multi-function wardrobe and a sliding bench seat in the rear which can be turned into a large air-sprung bed. A pop-up roof is also standard (electric assist is optional) providing standing height inside. An additional bed can be fitted in the pop-up roof area to increase sleeping capacity to four individuals. Fresh water and waste water tanks are accessible from outside the vehicle, while the gas-cylinder bay is hidden inside an interior cupboard. An auxiliary battery is included under the front passenger seat. Up to six optional individual seats can be fitted for maximum MPV flexibility, but only four seats (including the two-seater bench mentioned above) can be used when in camping mode.

The Marco Polo was designed and created in partnership with Westfalia just like Volkswagen camper vans were until 1999, when Daimler AG bought a controlling stake in the conversion company meaning Volkswagen had to continue converting their commercial vehicles into camper vans alone. This is a rival for the Volkswagen California as they both have similar layouts.

Viano X-Clusive (2008–2010)
This edition was only available in European markets from 2008 to 2010 with either a petrol or diesel V6 engine. It was available in either Brilliant Silver or Obsidian Black metallic paint, and featured a redesigned radiator grille, 18-inch alloy wheels, a chromed exhaust tailpipe, side skirts, and unique front and rear bumpers. The interior had pebble or anthracite coloured 'Twin' leather seats and a choice of grey or brown burr walnut wood accents.

Engines

Safety
Two head-on airbags and (on higher trim levels) front side airbags are fitted as standard, with front window airbags available as an option. Electronic stability control (ESP), traction control system (ASR), anti-lock braking system (ABS), electronic brakeforce distribution (EBV) and brake assist (BAS) are all fitted as standard. If BAS is activated, the hazard lights flash to warn following motorists that the Viano driver is undertaking an emergency braking manoeuvre.

Each seat is fitted with a three-point seatbelt with belt tensioner and force limiter and an adjustable head restraint.

The Viano underwent the Euro NCAP car safety tests in 2008 and achieved the following ratings:

The Australasian New Car Assessment Program (ANCAP) also tested the Viano and gave it a score of 32.66 points out of 37. It is the only van in Australasia to achieve the maximum five-star rating.

Environmental impact
EcoTest analysed the emissions from the EU4-compliant 2.0 CDI  and 2.2 CDI  manuals and the EU5-compliant 2.2 CDI  TouchShift; the results are below:

Next Green Car - an expert environmental organisation that analyses official vehicle emissions data rated the Viano. These Green Ratings (from 0 (cleanest) to 100 (dirtiest)) are listed below:

Reviews

The Mercedes-Benz Viano has received mixed to positive reviews from the motoring press. The van-based design is seen as a blessing by some critics and a failing by others. As of July 2010 reviews for the facelifted Viano are not available.
 AA, The 'Image is everything in the world of business and it should come as no surprise that the Viano is the big cheese in the executive travel world.'
 Autocar 'Still more van than MPV. Airport transport.'
 Parker's 'Pros: Capable of carrying eight in comfort, massive and versatile interior, superb diesels'.'Cons: Sheer size makes it difficult to manoeuvre, can't hide commercial vehicle origins.'
 RAC 'With its rare combination of spacious seating and generous luggage capacity, the Viano is a paragon of practicality...'
 What Car? 'For - Comes with a choice of two wheelbases and three body lengths, plus a variety of seating arrangements and plenty of space inside. The sliding rear side doors ease access.''Against - It's an expensive option, whose van roots show through in some areas. The engines are noisy and it's not easy to use the car's full versatility...'
 Yahoo! Cars "Most MPVs never make that much sense because when full of people there's nowhere for the luggage to go. No such problem exists with the vast Viano."

Motorsports
2006: The Viano was a support vehicle in the Dakar Rally for the Mercedes-Benz Service and Kwikpower team
2009: The Viano claimed victory in the SUV category in the 19th Rallye Aicha des Gazelles with Irishwoman Jeanette James as pilot and Frenchwoman Anne-Marie Ortola as navigator.

Production

On 16 April 2010 the assembly of the Viano W639 began at the Fujian Daimler Automotive plant in Fúzhōu, China. Forty per cent of the components and automotive parts of the Chinese model version are manufactured by local companies. The Chinese model was launched on the Chinese (Hong Kong, PRC and Republic), the South Korean and Southeast Asian market in April 2010.

2010 facelift

Viano

Changes to the Viano range include standard BlueEFFICIENCY technology, new interior trim materials, new ambient lighting system with dimmable individual LED reading lamps and fibre optic units, optional rear seat entertainment system, redesigned cockpit, new suspension with front and rear axles revised and specially tuned to match each specific model and EU 5 emission standards compliance.

A four-wheel drive (4MATIC) is optional on models with 4-cylinder diesel engines. In normal operation the system transfers driving power in a 35:65 split between the front and rear axles. The 4MATIC system does not have mechanical differential locks, but an electronic traction system (4ETS). If one or more wheels loses traction on a slippery surface, the system applies brief pulses of brake pressure to the spinning wheels thus increasing torque to wheels with good grip. Vehicles with four-wheel drive have a higher ride height, which increases approach, departure and breakover angles (20°/28°/19° respectively, versus 14°/22°/14° in conventional rear-wheel-drive models). The all-wheel drive adds  to the total weight of the vehicle.

Vito

The facelifted version of the Vito began from September 2010, and features restyled front and rear lights, restyled front bumpers, and more-efficient diesel engines adapted from the Mercedes-Benz Sprinter range. The Vito's suspension, instrumentation, steering wheel, and overall quality of materials was also improved.

Early models included Vito 110 CDI, Vito 113 CDI, Vito 116 CDI, Vito 122 CDI, Vito 126, with 3 body lengths (compact, long, extra-long).

Vito E-CELL (2010–2012)

Overview
Earlier limited-production and prototype Mercedes-Benz efforts to provide battery-electric delivery vans included the 1972 LE 306; the T1-based 307 E (1980) and 308 E (1988); the MB100 E (1992); the Sprinter 308 E (1995); and the Vito 108 E (1996).

In 2012 a seven-seater Vito E-Cell was unveiled at the 2012 Geneva Motor Show with the same powertrain. The Vito E-Cell was discontinued in 2012, with Mercedes-Benz citing low demand.

Production
The Vito E-Cell is the first electric vehicle mass-produced in Spain. It will be fabricated by Mercedes-Benz Spain, in the Vitoria-Gasteiz factory. Mercedes-Benz has chosen Vitoria as the exclusive fabrication site for the electric van; the E-Cell will be assembled alongside conventionally-powered Vito and Viano vans.

Mercedes-Benz expected 100 E-Cell vehicles to be produced by the end of 2010 and a further 2,000 by the end of 2011. The UK market was allocated 50 vehicles for the first year. All customers are to be vetted to ensure suitability and must return the van after four years to Mercedes. The first manufactured units (91 already) were presented on 7 February 2011. The goal is to produce 474 units by the end of the year. Most of them will be sold to foreign companies (mainly in Germany; Berlin and Stuttgart), though the Basque supermarket gamble Eroski has got four vans for distribution duties. Last year, the government made a plan in order to encourage this kind of cars. 590 million € will be funded, from which 7 have gone to the 'E-Cell' project. This project will also be supported by the Basque and German governments.

Drivetrain

The Vito E-Cell utilizes a unique front-wheel drive setup to save installation space for the 36-kWh lithium-ion battery pack housed underneath the van's cargo area.

Energy to move the van is stored in an electric battery. This battery is placed under the chassis (where the petrol tank and the prop-shaft are normally), while the electric traction motor, the transformer, and the charger are located in the engine's usual position, under the hood. The traction battery is split into 16 modules with 192 cells in all, with high energy density and a rated voltage of 360 volts. Gross battery capacity is 36 kWh, 32 kWh of which are available for the vehicle operation. The batteries weigh ; their life is unknown. It is considered that a range between  could be more realistic. Either way, it is intended to be enough for a workday in urban delivery.

The E-Cell is equipped with an onboard charger that has a maximum power input rate of 6.1 kW (AC); the total charge time is six hours through a high voltage connection (380 or 400 volts), but with a domestic 230 volt supply, the total charge time is double, about 12 hours. Moreover, Mercedes-Benz offers the vehicle as a lease (4 years / ), making the manufacturer responsible for battery maintenance and replacement when necessary.

Chassis and capacities
With this aim of saving space, only the front-drive version is offered, unlike in the previous model, so a long development was needed, although some suspension components of the all-wheel drive version were adapted for the E-Cell.

Externally, the Vito E-Cell does not show external changes with the other versions, aside from the decorative elements: the body has not been modified, and both the double side door and the helpful back 'gate' remain as before. The refueling port has been reused for the vehicle charging inlet port.

The Vito E-Cell is equipped with complete and modern features, including a special heater connected to the high voltage network and to the basic heating system, which ensures pleasant conditions even in the coldest months. In terms of safety, the new Mercedes keeps the same level as the other Vito models. The vehicle has many of the electric drivetrain components carried under the front bonnet, so, if a collision occurs, the batteries are protected by a shock element. The active safety also makes that the high-technology voltage network turns off when the airbag control unit activates. The Vito E-Cell comes standard with the Electronic Stability Program (ESP) and dual airbags.

Engines

Beginning with September 2011, BlueEFFICIENCY models of Viano and Vito include a new generator management system converts part of the kinetic energy produced into electric energy, which is then stored in the battery.

Transmissions

Performance

All Viano and Vito engines conformed to Euro 5 emission standards.

Security
The Viano was tested by Thatcham's New Vehicle Security Ratings (NVSR) organisation and achieved the following ratings:

Environmental impact
EcoTest analysed the emissions from the EU4-compliant 2.0 CDI  and 2.2 CDI  manuals and the EU5-compliant 2.2 CDI  TouchShift; the results are below:

Next Green Car - an expert environmental organisation that analyses official vehicle emissions data rated the Viano. These Green Ratings (from 0 (cleanest) to 100 (dirtiest)) are listed below:

2013 update
During 2013 a number of special editions were launched; including the Grand Edition Viano launched at the Geneva Motor Show. Two special version for the Japanese markets were launched the V350 White Edition (50 units) and Black Edition (170 units) with additional equipment, large alloy wheels and leather interior.

Two updated camper vans were launched at the 2013 Caravan Salon; the Fun and Marco Polo.

Engines

UK models included only 2.2 CDI (long/extra long), 3.0 CDI (long/extra long).

Transmissions

Production
As of 14 November 2013, Daimler's van joint venture Fujian Benz Automotive Co. (FBAC) has secured an order by the Dalian Wanda Group comprising 85 Mercedes-Benz Viano 3.0L vans.

Third generation (W447; 2014)

Models

V-Class (W447)

The third generation V-Class was launched in 2014 as a full size MPV to replace the R-Class. However, it also was marketed as a successor to the Mercedes-Benz Viano. Sales commenced in Germany in May 2014, with European sales following in June.

The V-Class was a long-wheelbase model initially, with compact and extra-long variants due at a later date. A special launch model based on the V 250 BlueTEC is called Edition 1, and is fitted with a range of additional equipment including leather interior, Burmester sound system and large alloy wheels and Agility Control suspension system.

Vito (W447)

The Vito panel van variant was also released in 2014. Changes to Vito included standard Attention Assist and Crosswind Assist, optional Intelligent Light System (LED indicators, LED daytime running lamps, LED low-beam headlamps, main beam with cornering light function).
The vehicle was unveiled in 2014 International Commercial Vehicles show.

An updated version was shown in 2020, with mild styling updates.

Metris (North America)

The vehicle also has been sold since 2015 in the United States and Canada as the Mercedes-Benz Metris; it was launched as a 2016 model year vehicle. At the time of its introduction it had the least expensive starting price for a new Mercedes-Benz model in the United States according to Car and Driver magazine. The Metris is assembled alongside the North American Sprinter at the Mercedes-Benz Vans plant in Ladson, South Carolina. It is available in both passenger and cargo variants; however, the passenger version is intended for taxi and shuttle services, not as luxury transportation equivalent to the V-Class. For the North American market, the drivetrain is limited to a single choice: a 2.0 L turbocharged gasoline-fueled four-cylinder with a seven-speed automatic transmission.

The United States Postal Service will purchase up to 30,000 right-hand drive Metris vehicles as part of the Commercial-Off-The-Shelf (COTS) vehicle program announced in 2018, to replace and upgrade its fleet of delivery vehicles.

The Mercedes-Benz Metris will be discontinued after the 2023 model year in the US and Canadian markets, due to poor sales and discontinuation of the exclusive gasoline engine that powers the North American Metris. The Vito will continue to be sold in markets outside the United States and Canada. The larger Sprinter will continue to be sold in the US and Canada beyond 2023 as the only commercial vehicle offered in these markets by Mercedes-Benz, with only diesel and all-electric powertrain options available.

EQV / eVito

The eVito, an electric panel van variant using the W447 chassis, was introduced in November 2017. Net capacity was 35 kW-hr.

The on-board charger had a maximum power input of 7.4 kW.

The EQV is an electrified variant of the V-Class using the same Vito W447 chassis; it was unveiled as a concept at the March 2019 Geneva Motor Show with a more powerful drivetrain and a more capacious battery than the eVito. A production prototype was shown that August. The EQV is equipped with a battery that has a gross/usable capacity of 100/90 kW-hr and on-board charging that accepts up to 11 kW (AC).

Production
Production of V-Class in Vitoria, Spain plant began in March 2014, followed by Mercedes-Benz Vito in autumn 2014. Also, it started production in Argentina and production at the Fujian Daimler plant in Fúzhōu, China started in March 2016.

The one petrol engine on offer is only sold in certain markets: in USA and Canada as the Metris, and in China and Indonesia as the Mercedes-Benz V260.

Engines 

BlueEFFICIENCY package is standard on all versions of V-Class featuring the 7G-TRONIC PLUS automatic transmission and is optionally available for all variants with 6-speed manual transmission.

Blue Efficiency package is available for Vito with OM 651 engine and rear-wheel drive, and standard for all Vito models with automatic transmission and a car registration.

Overboost is available for vehicles with 7G-TRONIC PLUS transmission and AGILITY SELECT, with transmission mode set to "Comfort" (C), "Sport" (S), or "Manual" (M).

Transmissions

V-Class with 7G-TRONIC PLUS transmission includes optional AGILITY SELECT system with 4 transmission modes ("ECO" (E), "Comfort" (C), "Sport" (S) and "Manual" (M)).

Dimensions

Notes

References

Notes

Bibliography

General

Workshop manuals

External links

 Mercedes-Benz V-Class
 Mercedes-Benz Viano (UK)
 Mercedes-Benz Vito (UK)
 MB Vans - Metris Cargo Van

Vito
Vans
Electric vans
Minibuses
ANCAP business and family vans
Euro NCAP business and family vans
Euro NCAP large MPVs
Vehicles introduced in 1996
1990s cars
2000s cars
2010s cars
2020s cars
Front-wheel-drive vehicles
Rear-wheel-drive vehicles
Cars powered by VR engines
Vito
Production electric cars